Dichomeris subiridescens is a moth in the family Gelechiidae. It was described by Anthonie Johannes Theodorus Janse in 1954. It is found in the Namibia, South Africa and Eswatini.

References

Moths described in 1954
subiridescens